The Byrnes & Kiefer Building in the Strip District neighborhood of  Pittsburgh, Pennsylvania, is a building from 1892. It was listed on the National Register of Historic Places in 1985.

References

Commercial buildings on the National Register of Historic Places in Pennsylvania
Commercial buildings in Pittsburgh
Romanesque Revival architecture in Pennsylvania
Commercial buildings completed in 1892
Pittsburgh History & Landmarks Foundation Historic Landmarks
National Register of Historic Places in Pittsburgh